Ursuline College is an all-girls Catholic voluntary Secondary School in Sligo . It is under the trusteeship of the Le Cheile Schools Trust.

History
The school traces its origins to 1850 when members of the order of Ursulines came to Sligo. The following year they established ‘’Nazareth’’, a free primary school. From this grew St. Joseph's National School and St. Vincent's Secondary School which became the Ursuline Convent.

References

Girls' schools in the Republic of Ireland
Secondary schools in County Sligo
Sligo (town)